The 1993 San Diego Chargers season was the team's 34th season, their 33rd in San Diego, and 24th in the National Football League.

The 1993 season began with the team trying to improve on their 11–5 record in 1992. Instead, they slipped to an 8-8 record. A tougher schedule made wins harder to come by - their beaten opponents averaged a 0.500 win percentage, compared to 0.369 the year before.

Uncertainty at the quarterback position contributed to a slow start. Stan Humphries suffered a shoulder injury in preseason, and posted a quarterback rating of just 46.12 through the first four games; John Friesz replaced him, posting better numbers but going 2-4 as a starter. Humphries returned for the final six games with a greatly improved rating of 90.7, and San Diego won four of them, but missed the playoffs by a single win.

The pass-catching corps were largely unchanged. Anthony Miller led the team in all major receiving categories (84 receptions, 1162 yards, 7 touchdowns), while Ronnie Harmon had 73 catches out of the backfield. Marion Butts (746 yards, 4 touchdowns) split time in the backfield with rookie Natrone Means (645 yards, 8 touchdowns). On defense, the leaders were Leslie O'Neal (12.0 sacks), Junior Seau (129 tackles), and Darren Carrington (7 interceptions, plus 1 fumble recovery). Veteran cornerback Gill Byrd missed the entire season with injury and retired - in his absence, San Diego dropped from 9th in the league to dead last against the pass. Kicker John Carney started the season in fine form, running the consecutive field goal streak he'd started in 1992 up to a new NFL record of 29. His form slipped as the season wore on, and he finished on 31 field goals from 40 attempts.

Offseason

NFL Draft

Personnel

Staff

Roster

Regular season

Schedule 

Note: Intra-division opponents are in bold text.

Game summaries

Week 1 

In a game with no offensive touchdowns, John Carney's six field goals brought San Diego their first opening day win for seven years. They had to overcome a terrible start, Stan Humphries' second pass attempt of the season being batted in the air by Cortez Kennedy for Joe Nash to intercept and return 13 yards for a touchdown. Humphries was intercepted again only three plays later, but Seattle missed a field goal, and the Charger offense began to move the ball. Four consecutive field goal drives had them up 12-10 at the half.

Marion Butts rushed for 87 yards on 15 carries, but had to leave the game early in the 3rd quarter. Still, the Chargers managed two more Carney kicks, the latter making it a two score game with just 5:35 to play. The Seahawks responded with a drive deep into Charger territory, but Burt Grossman recovered a fumble at the two. Charger punter John Kidd then gave up an intentional safety as time expired.

Carney's six field goals were a club record; he had successes from 50 and 51 yards out, becoming the first Charger with two 50+ yard field goals in the same game. Humphries wasn't intercepted again after the first two possession, but completed only 13 of 30 for 123 yards and a 27.5 QB rating.

Week 2 

The Chargers' first loss of the season arrived after a comeback attempt faltered. Two John Elway touchdown passes either side of an Eric Bieniemy fumble helped Denver lead 17-0 at halftime. Cornerback Marquez Pope played a key role in shifting momentum after the break, intercepting a pass and forcing a fumble on consecutive Bronco possessions. Both turnovers set the Chargers up with excellent field position, and both chances were converted, Humphries hitting Derrick Walker and Nate Lewis for touchdowns.

Now trailing only 17-14, San Diego were close to a stop on the next drive, but Elway converted a 3rd and 19 with a 46 yard completion to the one yard line. Ex-Charger Rod Bernstine scored a play later. Following an exchange of field goals, Humphries was intercepted and Denver iced the win.

Nate Lewis had 10 receptions and 119 yards, both career highs.

Week 3 

It was déjà vu for the Chargers, as John Carney kicked six field goals for the second consecutive home game. San Diego's defense played a huge role throughout the game; in the first half, Darren Carrington and Junior Seau both intercepted Warren Moon, either side of a Carrington fumble recovery. Each of these takeaways was converted into a field goal. Carney's third, from 27 yards out, gave him a streak of 26 consecutive regular season successes, stretching back to the previous season. This broke an NFL record set by Morten Andersen only a week earlier.

Moon got Houston in the end zone on their next drive, then Humphries threw his second pick six of the season, and it was 14-9 at the break. Humphries continued to struggle in the 3rd quarter, and was pulled for John Friesz, who completed a 47 yard pass downfield to Nate Lewis on his very first play. That set up Carney's fourth kick. Moon was intercepted on the next two Houston possessions: the first of these, by Sean Vanhorse, ended an Oiler threat; the second was Seau again, and led to Carney's fifth field goal and a 15-14 lead.

Moon was also benched at this point - his backup Cody Carlson drove Houston to a 3rd and 2 at the San Diego 8, whereupon a touchdown pass to Haywood Jeffires was incorrectly ruled to have been out of bounds. As a result, the Oliers settled for a field goal, and led by only two points with 4:59 to play. Friesz then completed four passes for 46 yards, as San Diego went 75 yards in 13 plays, culminating in Carney's final kick with just 3 seconds on the clock.

Humphries finished with just 7 completions from 26 attempts, for 73 yards and an interception, for a 23.6 QB rating.

Week 5 

Stan Humphries struggled again, and the Chargers slipped to 2-2. They trailed 7-0 when John Carney missed a 48 yard field goal, bringing his streak of consecutive kicks without a miss to an end at 29 (a record since surpassed). A Marion Butts run levelled the scores, but Humphries threw two interceptions thereafter as the Seahawks pulled away.

This time, Humphries completed 12 of 27 for 141 yards, with a QB rating of 30.0; three of the six worst ratings of his career came in the first four games of this season. John Friesz, who came in and threw a consolation score to Anthony Miller, was named the starter for the next game.

Week 6 

John Friesz struggled on his first start of the season, hindered by a rushing attack which could gain only 19 yards on 20 carries. Still, the defense kept them in the game at half time, trailing only 6-3. On the first Charger drive of the 3rd quarter, Friesz executed a successful QB sneak on 4th and 1, earning a 1st and goal at the 8. However, Kevin Greene hit Friesz as he threw on the next play, causing a goal line interception and knocking the quarterback out of the game with a concussion.

Humphries came in, but was soon sacked by Greg Lloyd, causing a fumble which Levon Kirkland recovered and ran in for the game's only touchdown. San Diego finished with 138 yards, their worst tally for 16 years.

Week 7 

San Diego dropped a thriller to lose their third straight. Shortly after Anthony Miller had an 89 yard touchdown reception chalked off for a Harry Swayne hold, the Chiefs opened the scoring, veterans Joe Montana and Marcus Allen combing from 15 yards out. The Chargers were forced to punt on their next possession, but John Kidd's monster 67 yard kick pinned Kansas City at their own three. This shift in field position set San Diego up for a 36 yard touchdown drive, rookie Natrone Means powering over the goal line for his first career touchdown. Montana and Friesz then exchanged interceptions, before a Nick Lowery field goal made it 10-7 at the break.

John Carney had a chance to tie the scores in the 3rd quarter, but saw his kick blocked. Early in the 4th, Darrien Gordon returned a punt 54 yards to the three, and Miller caught the go-ahead touchdown pass on 3rd and goal. Lowery then hit the upright from 35 yards out, before Carney had another one blocked. Taking over on the 20 with 3:27 to play, Montana then led his team on the game-winning drive, converting a 4th and 10 along the way. Allen scored from a yard out with 1:57 remaining. Friesz also managed to convert a 4th and 10, but then threw four consecutive incompletions from the Kansas City 47.

Anthony Miller caught 6 passes for 105 yards and a touchdown. This result broke a string of nine consecutive home wins for San Diego, including one in the playoffs.

Week 9 

Donald Frank's 102 yard interception return gave the Chargers a much-needed win. Los Angeles got off to an ideal start, Jeff Hostetler finding Tim Brown for a 71 yard touchdown on their very first play. San Diego responded quickly with Anthony Miller's 29 yard touchdown reception on the next drive. Following an exchange of field goals, it was 10-10 at halftime.

The Hostetler-to-Brown connection produced another long touchdown in the 3rd quarter (38 yards); San Diego again responded on the ensuing drive, Shawn Jefferson gaining 33 yards on a reverse before Butts ran it in from 12 yards out. Hostetler, who passed for 424 yards on the day, moved his team to the Charger 5 with a 55 yard completion, but threw his next pass straight at Frank, who ran the length of the field for an easy touchdown. Gary Plummer intercepted Hostetler on the next drive, and the teams traded field goals through the final quarter.

While Friesz only threw for 162 yards, the rushing duo of Means and Butts gained 68 and 64 yards respectively.

Week 10 

A balanced offensive performance saw the Chargers even their record at 4-4. A short TD run by Butts opened the scoring, and San Diego led 10-3 at the break. A 66 yard strike from Friesz to Miller extended the advantage, but John Carney missed the conversion, and back-to-back touchdown drives by Minnesota put the Vikings up by a point.

San Diego regained control with a trio of 4th quarter turnovers. First, Sean Vanhorse intercepted Sean Salisbury, and Means put the Chargers ahead seven plays later. On the ensuing kickoff, Marquez Pope forced a fumble, and Friesz found Shawn Jefferson for the Chargers' second score in barely a minute. Finally, Chris Mims knocked the ball from Salisbury's hands, with Leslie O'Neal recovering to end the final Viking threat.

Friesz went 20 of 32 for 268 yards with two touchdowns and no interceptions, while Miller caught 7 balls for 142 yards and one score. Means had 17 carries for 105 yards and a touchdown - the first 100-yard game of his career.

Week 11 

John Carney's late miss saw the Chargers drop a close game. San Diego sent their field goal unit onto the field at the end of their first three drives. The first two times, Carney attempted kicks - one successful, one blocked. The third time, holder John Kidd swept around left end for a touchdown and a 10-0 lead. Chicago then took charge, three field goals and a Jim Harbaugh touchdown pass putting them up 16-10 late in the 3rd quarter. The Chargers converted three 3rd downs and a 4th down on their next drive, but were eventually forced to settle for a field goal.

Plummer then intercepted Harbaugh in Charger territory, and Friesz led a 46 yard drive. However, Carney's kick missed badly to the left with 1:11 to play, and Chicago ran the clock out.

Week 12 

Los Angeles dominated several key statistics, even if the final score was close. The Raiders had more yards (428 to 154) plays (81 to 42) and time of possession (41:48 to 18:12). The tone was set by the opening drive of the game, as LA went 86 yards in 19 plays, taking 11:22 before stalling at the goal line and kicking a field goal. They had to settle for 3 points on three further red zone visits - a pair of turnovers also kept the score down.

For the Chargers, John Friesz struggled during his rare visits to the field, going 3 of 8 for 38 yards, and getting sacked twice. Stan Humphries came in at halftime, but saw a 44 yard completion to Shawn Jefferson wiped out by an offensive pass interference penalty, and couldn't breech the Raider red zone until late on in the game. After the fourth Raider field goal, Humphries threw six straight completions for 73 yards, the final nine coming on a touchdown to Nate Lewis. However, there was only 1:53 to play - the Raiders recovered an onside kick and only 14 seconds remained when San Diego got the ball back, whereupon Humphries was intercepted.

Week 13 

The Charger defense had three takeaways while imposing a Monday Night shutout. Indianapolis drove to a first down at the Charger 26 on the game's first possession, but Stanley Richard intercepted an underthrown HB option pass, and there were few threats thereafter.

Stan Humphries had a successful return to the starting lineup, going 16 of 25 for 216 yards, and 2nd quarter touchdowns to Jefferson and Lewis. In the second half, Chris Mims and Junior Seau recovered a pair of fumbles, which San Diego turned into rushing touchdowns by Butts and Eric Bieniemy. In total, the Chargers rolled up 247 yards on the ground.

It was the second consecutive season in which San Diego shut out the Colts.

Week 14 

John Carney kicked the winner, as both he and the Chargers overcame their early errors. In the first half, Carney missed two long field goals, and a Nate Lewis touchdown was negated by a penalty. San Diego were also fooled by a fake field goal, and it was 10-0 Denver at the break.

Darren Carrington intercepted John Elway on the first play of the second half, and the tide began to turn, the turnover leading to a successful field goal, before Means tied the scores early in the 4th quarter. After Denver missed a field goal and both team punted, the Chargers began their final possession on their own 5 yard line. Following an eight yard run by Means, Humphries threw on 10 consecutive plays, completing 7 passes for 72 yards. Carney's decisive kick came from 34 yards out with 3 seconds left.

Week 15 

San Diego's playoff chances took a knock, as Green Bay edged a hard-fought encounter. The Packers took an early 7-0 lead, after which both sides kicked two field goals, and Brett Favre and Stan Humphries were intercepted on consecutive plays - it was 13-6 at the break.

Early in the 3rd quarter, Humphries led his team to a 4th and 4 at the Green Bay 34. They opted to go for it, but Humphries was sacked, and the Packers soon doubled their lead. A Nate Lewis reception soon had San Diego back in the game, after which they crossed midfield twice more, but could produce no further points. Means was stopped for a loss on 4th and 1 from the 37, and Humphries threw an interception on 2nd and 9 from the 43 with 2:29 on the clock.

In total, Humphries completed 27 of a career-high 51 attempts, for 257 yards, 1 touchdown and 3 interceptions. Anthony Millar had 8 catches for 103 yards.

Week 16 

The Chargers were officially eliminated from playoff contention, after losing a topsy-turvy struggle. They a dream start, Donald Frank intercepting Joe Montana on the very first play from scrimmage, and Stan Humphries throwing a 28 yard touchdown to Ronnie Harmon three plays later. Humphries was knocked out of the game with a concussion, but the big plays kept coming, Plummer forcing a fumble which Mims recovered, setting up a Carney field goal. When blocking tight end Duane Young caught his first career touchdown pass from Friesz, it was 17-0 three seconds into the 2nd quarter.

The Chiefs responded quickly, scoring 14 points on their next two drives, and turning a Gordon fumble and Friesz interception into 14 more after half time. The tide then turned San Diego's way, with consecutive drives into the red zone - they turned the ball over on downs the first time, but quickly forced a punt and scored through Means.

The final Charger drive began on their own 28 with 2:07 to play. Friesz completed four consecutive passes to reach a first down at the Kansas City 32, but threw straight at Albert Lewis on the next play for a game-sealing interception.

Week 17: vs. Miami Dolphins 

After scoring only six touchdowns in their previous seven home games, the Chargers exploded for six in a single night, routing the playoff-chasing Dolphins and avenging their recent playoff defeat. The biggest scoring plays came in the 2nd quarter. First, Natrone Means burst through the line and outran the secondary for a 65 yard touchdown, his second of the game. Then, with five seconds to play in the half, the Chargers reached the Dolphin 41 with five seconds to play in the half. Humphries lofted a Hail Mary that was deflected in the air and grabbed by Anthony Miller just before he stepped out of the end zone. Harmon, Miller and Means added further scores in a processional second half.

Humphries finished 19 of 29 for 248 yards, three touchdowns and no interceptions, a QB rating of 126.8. Miller had 7 catches for 110 yards and two touchdowns; Means carried 18 times for 118 yards and scored three times. On defense, Darren Carrington had two interceptions while Donald Frank added a third.

Week 18 

A strong finish saw the Chargers level their record at 8-8. A 48 yard Anthony Miller touchdown opened the scoring, and the Chargers led 13-3 at halftime. After San Diego botched a fake field, the game turned Tampa Bay's way, and they led 17-16 with 8:26 to play. John Carney's fourth field goal of the game restored the Chargers lead, before they converted a pair of interceptions into touchdowns by Duane Young and Natrone Means.

Humphries had another strong showing: 18 of 30, for 272 yards, 2 touchdowns and no interceptions. Anthony Miller caught 7 passes for 119 yards and his 40th and final touchdown as a Charger.

Standings

References 

San Diego Chargers
San Diego Chargers seasons
San Diego Chargers f